Li Wenliang (born April 21, 1967) is a veteran Chinese chess player and (as of 2002) China's Deputy National Team Manager.

He has competed once at the World Men's Team Chess Championship in 1993, having played 9 games (+4 =4 -1). Though the team overall finished in 7th place, Li won an individual gold medal for his performance on board 4.

In 2008, he tied for 1st-5th with Yang Kaiqi, Salor Sitanggang, Jaan Ehlvest and Utut Adianto in the 1st Korea Open chess tournament in Seoul.

China Chess League
Li Wenliang plays for Guangdong chess club in the China Chess League (CCL).

See also
Chess in China

References

External links

Li Wenliang at Chessmetrics
Li Wenliang at Chess-Online.ru

1967 births
Living people
Sportspeople from Heilongjiang
Chess players from Heilongjiang
People from Harbin
Sportspeople from Harbin
Chess players from Harbin
Chinese chess players
Chess International Masters